Micralarctia australis is a moth of the family Erebidae. It was described by Watson in 1988. It is found in Namibia.

References

 Natural History Museum Lepidoptera generic names catalog

Endemic fauna of Namibia
Spilosomina
Moths described in 1988